The 14th Film Critics Circle of Australia Awards, given on 7 November 2004, in Sydney, which honoured the best in film for 2004.

Winners

Credits:
 Best Film: Somersault produced by Anthony Anderson
 Best Director: Cate Shortland for Somersault
 Best Cinematography: Robert Humphreys for Somersault
 Best Editor: Ken Sallows for Tom White
 Best Actor – Lead Role: Colin Friels for Tom White
 Best Actress – Lead Role: Abbie Cornish for Somersault
 Best Actor – Supporting Role: Dan Spielman for Tom White
 Best Actress – Supporting Role: Lynette Curran for Somersault
 Best Screenplay – Adapted: Rolf de Heer for The Old Man Who Read Love Stories
 Best Screenplay – Original: Daniel Keene for Tom White
 Best Music Score: David Hobson, Josh Abrahams, Lisa Gerrard for One Perfect Day
 Best Foreign Film - English Language: Lost in Translation directed by Sofia Coppola
 Best Foreign Language Film: The Barbarian Invasions (Les invasions barbares) directed by Denys Arcand
 Best Feature Documentary: The Men Who Would Conquer China directed by Nick Torrens, Jane St Vincent Welch
 Best Short Documentary: Mr Patterns directed by Catriona McKenzie 
 Best Short Film: Birthday Boy directed by Sejong Park
 Emerging Talent: Sejong Park

References

External links 

 Film Critics Circle Of Australia

2004 in Australian cinema
Film Critics Circle of Australia Awards
A